Hormogaster is a genus of annelids belonging to the family Hormogastridae.

The species of this genus are found in Europe.

Species:

Hormogaster abbatissae 
Hormogaster abbatissae 
Hormogaster arenicola 
Hormogaster castillana 
Hormogaster catalaunensis

References

Annelids